The 1982–83 La Liga season, the 52nd since its establishment, started on September 4, 1982, and finished on May 1, 1983.

Teams and locations

League table

Position by round

Results table

Pichichi Trophy 

La Liga seasons
1982–83 in Spanish football leagues
Spain